Mandibular premolar may refer to:

 Mandibular first premolar
 Mandibular second premolar